Sony MIX was an Indian pay television music channel owned by Sony Pictures Networks that broadcast Hindi-language music videos. It was launched on 1 September 2011. After more than eight years of broadcasting, the sudden decision to close one of the popular channel had many viewers expressing their dismay on social media. Sony Pictures Networks India decided to shut the broadcasting operations of Sony Mix from 31 March 2020 at 12:00 M.N. onwards from all leading DTH & MSO platforms.

Audience Music Awards 
The channel launched its own music awards in 2018, named Audience Music Awards to honour the artists of the Indian music industry.

References

External links
 Official website

Sony Pictures Networks India
Sony Pictures Entertainment
Television channels and stations established in 2011 
Television channels and stations disestablished in 2020
Television stations in Mumbai
2011 establishments in Maharashtra
Indian companies established in 2011
Indian companies disestablished in 2020